Baraz (also Romanized as Bārāz; also known as Bāzār, Vārāz, and Warāz) is a village in Qaen Rural District, in the Central District of Qaen County, South Khorasan Province, Iran. At the 2006 census, its population was 437 whitoth mohammad rafeii, in 159 families.

References 

Populated places in Qaen County